The Bundesvision Song Contest 2012 was the eighth edition of the annual Bundesvision Song Contest musical event. The contest was held on 28 September 2012 at the Max-Schmeling-Halle, Berlin, following Tim Bendzko's win in the 2011 contest in North Rhine-Westphalia with the song "Wenn Worte meine Sprache wären". This was the second time that the Max-Schmeling-Halle arena had hosted the contest after previously hosting in 2010, and Berlin's third time of hosting the contest, after previously hosting in 2007, and 2010. The contest was hosted by Stefan Raab, Sandra Rieß, and Elton in the green room.

The winner of the Bundesvision Song Contest 2012 was Xavas (Xavier Naidoo and Kool Savas) with the song "Schau nicht mehr zurück", representing Baden-Württemberg, the song also reached number 2 in the German singles chart. In second place was Laing (band) representing Saxony, and third place to  representing Lower Saxony.

Boris Lauterbach from Fettes Brot who represented Schleswig-Holstein in 2005, returns under the name "Der König tanzt" representing Hamburg.

Berlin's 2006 winning band Seeed, performed as the opening act, singing "Augenbling" and "Beautiful". Tim Bendzko performed as the interval act singing his winning song from 2011, "Wenn Worte meine Sprache wären".

10 of the 16 states awarded themselves the maximum of 12 points, with Bavaria, Berlin, Brandenburg, Hesse, Rhineland-Palatinate, and Saxony-Anhalt awarding themselves 10, 8, 8, 8, 10, and 8 points respectively.

Results

Scoreboard

References

External links
 Official BSC website at tvtotal.de

2012
Bundesvision Song Contest
2012 song contests